Érsekvadkert is a village in Nógrád County, Hungary with 3,526 inhabitants (2011).

References

External links
  

Populated places in Nógrád County